O-Town is a Nigerian crime gangster film written and directed by C.J. Obasi. The film stars Paul Utomi as Peace, a hustler at the center of various issues in the small town of Owerri, also known as O-Town. The film's music was composed by Beatoven and Wache Pollen and filming took place in Owerri.

Of the film, Obasi has described as a "crime-gangster thriller. It’s a semi-autobiographical tale because it draws from some of the crime stories I knew and heard; growing up in a small town called Owerri in Imo State. It’s also my exploration into genre Film-making, where I explore basically my love for film."

Story 
The film is set in a lightly fictionalised version of Owerri  ruled over by a sadistic gangster, The Chairman (Kalu Ikeagwu). The story is told from the viewpoint of an omnipresent, anonymous filmmaker and it follows the travails of Peace (Paul Utomi), a small time hustler with an ambition to become the head of the streets.

Cast 
 Paul Utomi as Peace
 Brutus Richard as Sheriff
 Ifeanyi Delvin Ijeoma as Paami
 Chucks Chyke as The Artiste
 Ifu Ennada as Amara
 Lucy Ameh as Jenny
 Kalu Ikeagwu as The Chairman
 Olu Alvin as Viper

Reception

Release and reception 
It first premiered at the 2015 edition of the Africa International Film Festival held in Lagos. Nigerian critic Oris Aigbokhaevbolo described it as "overindulgent but brilliant".

Goteborg Film Festival's artistic director Jonas Holmberg described O-Town as a “Tarantinesque” drama.

Official Selection 
 Africa International Film Festival (AFRIFF), 2015
 Goteborg Film Festival, 2016

Awards and recognition

References

External links 
 

English-language Nigerian films
Gangster films
2015 films
Nigerian crime films
2015 crime films
2010s English-language films